The Snowbird was a sailing event on the Sailing at the 1932 Summer Olympics program in Los Angeles Harbor.  Eleven races were scheduled. 12 sailors, on 11 boats, from 11 nation competed.

Race schedule

Course area and course configuration 
The courses had been well prepared. The marks were laid by the United States Lighthouse Service in the form of large Government. Visiting yachts were kept at a safe distance from the racing boats by the US Coast Guard. Tows were arranged by the US Navy to and from Los Angeles Harbor to the race area. The Snowbird stayed inside the breakwater to protect them from the ocean swell. Unfortunately no documentation is found about the course configuration(s) yet.

Weather conditions 
Due to the normal afternoon sea breeze in Los Angeles Harbor it was decided to race the Snowbirds in the morning. However it turned out that in various morning there was no wind at all. This made it necessary to run the Snowbirds races in the afternoon in windy conditions. It also made id difficult for several sailors to sail the races in the Snowbird as well in one of the other classes.

Final results

Daily standings

Notes 
 For this event one yacht from each country, crewed by 1 amateur maximum (maximum number of substitutes 1) was allowed.
 This event was a gender independent event. However it turned out that only men participated.

Other information 
During the Sailing regattas at the 1932 Summer Olympics among others the following persons were competing in the Snowbird:

After the finish of the last race, Maas seemed to have won the gold medal. His French opponent Jacques Baptiste Lebrun, however, successfully had a protest re-opened about an earlier penalty after the competition had ended, which moved him into first place, and put Maas back to second place.

Further reading

References 

Snowbird
Snowbird (sailboat)